Walther Kohlhase (6 March 1908 – 14 April 1993) was a German painter. His work was part of the painting event in the art competition at the 1932 Summer Olympics.

References

1908 births
1993 deaths
20th-century German painters
20th-century German male artists
German male painters
Olympic competitors in art competitions
People from Anhalt-Bitterfeld